Joensuu is a Finnish surname. Notable people with the surname include:

Jasmi Joensuu (born 1996), Finnish cross-country skier
Jesse Joensuu (born 1987), Finnish ice hockey player
Jouni Joensuu (born 1962), Finnish association football manager
Matti Yrjänä Joensuu (1948–2011), Finnish writer of crime fiction
Timo Joensuu (born 1959), Finnish oncologist, professor and researcher of cancer treatments

Finnish-language surnames